The 47th G7 summit was held from 11 to 13 June 2021 in Cornwall, England, during the United Kingdom's tenure of the presidency of the Group of Seven (G7), an inter-governmental political forum of seven advanced nations.

The participants included the leaders of the seven G7 member states, as well as representatives of the European Union. The president of the European Commission has been a permanently welcome participant at all meetings and decision-making since 1981, while the current president of the European Council has been the EU's co-representative since the 36th G8 summit in 2010.

Leaders at the summit

Participants included leaders of the G7 member states plus representatives of the European Union. The president of the European Commission has been a permanent participant at all meetings since 1981. The president of the European Council has been the EU's co-representative since the 36th G8 summit hosted by Canada in 2010.

In March 2014, the G7 declared that a meaningful discussion was currently not possible with Russia in the context of the G8. Since then, meetings have continued within the G7 process. Donald Trump and Emmanuel Macron were reported to have agreed that Russia should be invited to the 46th G7 summit in 2020, but the United Kingdom and Canada threatened to veto such a proposal if the United States and France went ahead. The 2020 summit was ultimately cancelled due to the COVID-19 pandemic.

Boris Johnson, Prime Minister of the United Kingdom, invited leaders from India, South Korea, South Africa and Australia. Australia welcomed the official invitation. Moon Jae-in, President of South Korea, accepted the invitation and extended an invitation to Johnson to attend the Partnering for Green Growth and the Global Goals 2030 (P4G Summit) in May 2021, which Johnson accepted. Narendra Modi, Prime Minister of India, also accepted the invitation. It has been suggested that Boris Johnson is attempting to expand the G7 group, a meeting forum for the world's leading economies, to create the D10, a forum for the world's ten leading democracies.

The 2021 summit was the first summit attended by Italian Prime Minister Mario Draghi and US President Joe Biden, and was the last summit attended by German Chancellor Angela Merkel. It was also the first and only summit for Japanese Prime Minister Yoshihide Suga.

Queen Elizabeth II also hosted G7 leaders at the Eden Project following the first day of talks.

Participants and representatives

Gallery of participating leaders

Invited guests

António Guterres, the United Nations Secretary-General, also attended the summit, whilst Narendra Modi, the Indian Prime Minister, participated remotely due to the ongoing COVID-19 crisis in India.

Agenda

Topics of discussion included developing a response to the COVID-19 pandemic and climate change. British Prime Minister Boris Johnson pledged to call for the G7 to work on a global approach to pandemics to ensure an equal global distribution of COVID-19 vaccines and to prevent future pandemics. He proposed a five-point plan to prevent future pandemics, which includes a worldwide network of zoonotic research hubs, developing global manufacturing capacity for treatments and vaccines, the design of a global early warning system, the agreement of global protocols for a future health emergency and the reduction of trade barriers. The G7 nations agreed to pledge 1 billion vaccines to other countries. South African President Cyril Ramaphosa urged the group to boost COVID-19 testing, diagnostics and vaccines to help finance the World Health Organization's program on those issues. Johnson also focused on climate change, a top priority for the United Kingdom ahead of the COP26 conference, which it was due to host in November 2021. UK Secretary for Business Kwasi Kwarteng indicated that Johnson sought coordinated action on carbon border taxes, green finance, the phase-out of coal and helping poorer countries to step up climate action. While the taxes were backed by the EU and US, EU climate ambassador Mark Vanhuekelen indicated that Australia may oppose the measures. The G7 nations pledged to reach net-zero emissions by 2050.

Another topic of discussion was international co-ordination on economic policies. United States Secretary of the Treasury Janet Yellen said there would be a revival in American multilateralism, focused on continued economic support. Other finance ministers, including Italian economy minister Daniele Franco, French Finance Minister Bruno Le Maire and UK chancellor Rishi Sunak similarly called for close economic co-ordination on recovery plans and economic policies. Negotiations over reforming the corporate taxation of multinationals were also carried out, with the United States agreeing to a deadline of the summer to make progress on the issue after threatening to impose tariffs on European countries in retaliation for their new digital sales tax. The United States also reviewed a plan for the IMF to allocate up to £500bn in special drawing rights to its members, which had been widely endorsed by other countries but was previously blocked by the US. The G7 countries also launched the Build Back Better World initiative, a plan to fund infrastructure development in low and middle income countries.

G7 finance officials also supported the need to regulate digital currencies. German Finance Minister Olaf Scholz issued a statement about his concerns of authorizing the launch of Facebook's Diem (formerly Libra) cryptocurrency in Europe.

Boris Johnson stated that he would aim to 'unlock' travel restrictions between UK and amber-list US at G7 summit. It is unclear whether any agreement was made.

The G7 nations called for peace in the Taiwan Strait. In response to this, a spokesperson for the Chinese embassy in London stated that "The days when global decisions were dictated by a small group of countries are long gone."

Events leading to the summit

On 12 February 2021, finance ministers and central bank governors from the G7 members held a meeting to discuss the relevant financial issues, from fiscal stimulus to aid for poor countries. They were joined by representatives from the European Commission, the European Central Bank, and the Eurogroup, as well as leaders of the IMF, World Bank Group, OECD and Financial Stability Board.

On 19 February 2021, a virtual meeting of G7 leaders was held to call for further international cooperation on vaccine distribution and to take steps on rebuilding from the coronavirus pandemic. The United Kingdom is expected to challenge other G7 countries to speed up the development of future vaccines to 100 days (a target previously set by the Coalition for Epidemic Preparedness Innovations) and to build momentum for a more coordinated approach to future pandemics, including the creation of a global health treaty. Ahead of the meeting, Johnson promised to share surplus vaccines doses with developing countries and to call for help to develop vaccines more quickly. The meeting was US President Joe Biden's first multilateral engagement after taking office. He stressed the importance of international cooperation and declared "America is Back."

Japanese Prime Minister Yoshihide Suga stated Japan's determination to host the Tokyo Olympic and Paralympic Games. The G7 leaders supported the Olympics in the Leaders' Statement.

Also on 19 February 2021, the G7 leaders released their 'Leader's Statement' in which they pledged to intensify cooperation on the health response to COVID-19 and to support economic recovery. All leaders agreed on the need to ensure coronavirus vaccines, therapeutics and diagnostics reach those that need them and agreed on the need for a green, sustainable global recovery, in particular welcoming the United States' readmission to the Paris Climate Agreement. David Malpass, President of the World Bank, welcomed what he said was a new “spirit of international cooperation” by G7 nations and its enlarged commitments to COVAX. However, Malpass also stated that a lack of transparency of contracts and delivery schedules was hampering the effort to get vaccines to developing countries quickly.

On 12 March 2021, the Foreign Ministers of G7 and the High Representative of the EU issued a joint statement on Hong Kong electoral change, expressing their grave concerns at the Chinese authorities’ decision fundamentally to erode democratic elements of the electoral system in Hong Kong.

On 18 March 2021, the Foreign Ministers of G7 and the High Representative of the EU issued a joint statement of condemnation of the continued annexation of Crimea by Russia.

On 22 March 2021, Prime Minister Boris Johnson invited the South African President Cyril Ramaphosa to attend the G7 Leaders’ Summit as a guest.

On 31 March 2021, the G7 Trade Ministers held their first meeting under the inaugural G7 Trade Track. They reaffirmed the importance of the rules-based multilateral trading system and welcomed Ngozi Okonjo-Iweala, the new WTO Director-General, to their meeting.

On 12 April 2021, the G7 foreign ministers issued their joint appeal on the eve of a NATO meeting in Brussels over concerns that the years-long War in Donbas could escalate sharply.

On 5 June 2021, during a meeting at Lancaster House in London, the G7 finance ministers agreed on a deal to commit towards a minimum global corporate tax rate of at least 15 percent, which will be aimed at preventing tax havens which cater for large multinational corporations. The commitment will also include steps to ensure that taxes are paid in the countries where businesses operate.

Queen Elizabeth II also hosted G7 leaders at the Eden Project following the first day of talks in Cornwall. At the age of 95, the Queen had already received two doses of an undisclosed COVID-19 vaccine and adhered to government guidelines while hosting world leaders.

Reaction from China
The Chinese government reacted negatively in response to criticism from the G7 of its human rights record, with the Chinese embassy in the UK accusing the group of "interfering", as well as "lies, rumours and baseless accusations".

After the summit

Indian PM's address
Following the summit media in India widely reported on Indian PM's address to G7. However, no address transcript, video or audio was released publicly. A sitting MP from the ruling party itself raised objection to this omission. The Press Information Bureau of India, government's PR agency released only a statement about the speech, instead of releasing the transcript as is usual.

COVID-19 outbreak
Following the summit the confirmed COVID-19 cases in Cornwall increased to 81.7 per 100,000 population on the Sunday after the summit, from 2.8 per 100,000 on the Sunday before the summit. The districts in which G7 events took place subsequently had the highest rates in Cornwall, with St Ives, the town nearest Carbis Bay, the highest at 920 per 100,000. The UK government denied the summit had caused the rapid rise in cases in Cornwall, pointing to the increase in summer tourism and an outbreak among students. Professor Tim Spector, lead scientist on the COVID Symptom Study, explained it as a "sudden influx of holidaymakers over half-term, as well as the recent G7 Summit and a previously unexposed local population".

United States' non-consultation of United Kingdom and NATO over Afghanistan troop withdrawal
During the summit, Biden and Johnson had announced a New Atlantic Charter as evidence for their Special Relationship. The Biden administration subsequently withdrew American troops from Afghanistan in August 2021 without any coordination with other NATO members, prompting backlash from members of the British government.

AUKUS
Brokered by the UK, details of the AUKUS agreement between Australia, the US, and the UK were agreed during the summit. The discussions took place without the knowledge of French President Macron. This approach was possible as a result of the UK not entering into a formal foreign policy and security treaty in the post-Brexit deal with the European Union (EU). As a result, the UK was free to pursue enhanced cooperation with other allies.

See also
 2021 Brussels summit
 2021 Russia–United States summit

Reference list

External links

Official website

2020s in Cornwall
2021 conferences
2021 in British politics
2021 in international relations
21st-century diplomatic conferences (Global)
Diplomatic conferences in the United Kingdom
2021
June 2021 events in the United Kingdom